Rim may refer to:
Rim (basketball), the hoop through which the ball must pass
Breakaway rim, a sprung basketball rim
Rim (coin), the raised edge which surrounds the coin design
Rim (crater), extending above the local surface
Rim (firearms), a projection machined into the bottom of a firearms cartridge
Rim (novel), by Alexander Besher
Rim (wheel), the outer part of a wheel on which the tire is mounted
Slang term for analingus
"Rim", a song by Brooke Candy featuring Violet Chachki and Aquaria from the album Sexorcism

RIM may stand for:
Rapid Interim Measures proposed by the Review Body on Bid Challenges under the World Trade Organization's Agreement on Government Procurement
Reaction injection molding, a type of processing for network polymers
Recording Industry Association of Malaysia
Red Island Minerals, Australia coal company
Reference Information Model, in Health Level Standards 7
Remote Infrastructure Management of computer systems
Research in Motion, a Canadian company later named BlackBerry Limited
Revolutionary Internationalist Movement, an international Maoist organization
Royal Indian Marine, name of the British Indian navy 1912–1928
The US military designation for a ship-launched, intercept, guided missile; examples include
RIM-66 Standard
RIM-7 Sea Sparrow
Russian Imperial Movement, Russian neo-Nazi paramilitary organization

Places
Rim, Črnomelj, Slovenia
Rim, Nepal, Salyan District, Rapti Zone
Rim, Primorje-Gorski Kotar County, a village near Vrbovsko, Croatia
Rim (state constituency), an election constituency in the Malacca legislature in Malaysia

See also
RIMS (disambiguation)